Balbieriškis is a small town in Kaunas County in central Lithuania. It is situated on the left bank of the Neman River. As of 2011 it had a population of 966. The town was established by German lumberman Hanus, who received a plot of land in wilderness of Suvalkija from Grand Duke Sigismund I the Old. Hanus cleared the forest and built an estate. The settlement grew around the estate and was awarded city rights in 1530. However, the privileges were revoked in 1776.

References

Towns in Lithuania
Towns in Kaunas County
Suwałki Governorate
Shtetls